The 1998 Women's Asian Games Basketball Tournament was held in Thailand from 8 to 18 December 1998.

Results

Preliminary round

Group E

Group F

5th place game

Final round

Semifinals

Bronze medal game

Gold medal game

Final standing

References
Results

External links
Results

Women